An audio frequency or audible frequency (AF) is a periodic vibration whose frequency is audible to the average human. The SI unit of frequency is the hertz (Hz). It is the property of sound that most determines pitch.

The generally accepted standard hearing range for humans is 20 to 20,000 Hz. Frequencies below 20 Hz are generally felt rather than heard, assuming the amplitude of the vibration is great enough. Sound frequencies above 20 kHz are called ultrasonic.

Sound propagates as mechanical vibration waves of pressure and displacement, in air or other substances. In general, frequency components of a sound determine its "color", its timbre. When speaking about the frequency (in singular) of a sound, it means the property that most determines its pitch. Higher pitches have higher frequency, and lower pitches are lower frequency. 

The frequencies an ear can hear are limited to a specific range of frequencies.  The audible frequency range for humans is typically given as being between about 20 Hz and 20,000 Hz (20 kHz), though the high frequency limit usually reduces with age. Other species have different hearing ranges. For example, some dog breeds can perceive vibrations up to 60,000 Hz. 

In many media, such as air, the speed of sound is approximately independent of frequency, so the wavelength of the sound waves (distance between repetitions) is approximately inversely proportional to frequency.

Frequencies and descriptions

See also
Absolute threshold of hearing
Hypersonic effect, controversial claim for human perception above 20,000 Hz
Loudspeaker
Musical acoustics
Piano key frequencies
Scientific pitch notation
Whistle register

References

Acoustics
Sound
Sound measurements
Physical quantities
Audio engineering